Joël Arseneau is a Canadian politician, who was elected to the National Assembly of Quebec in the 2018 provincial election. He represents the electoral district of Îles-de-la-Madeleine as a member of the Parti Québécois.

Arseneau previously served as mayor of Les Îles-de-la-Madeleine from 2005 to 2013. He was removed from office on fraud charges resulting from delayed expense claim payments. Although he was acquitted of the charges on the grounds that the issue was a personal accounting error rather than a deliberate attempt to defraud the municipality, he was barred in 2015 from running for municipal office for five years, leading to some controversy when his selection as a Parti Québécois candidate for the provincial legislature was announced.

Electoral record

References

Living people
French Quebecers
Parti Québécois MNAs
21st-century Canadian politicians
People from Gaspésie–Îles-de-la-Madeleine
Mayors of places in Quebec
Year of birth missing (living people)